Edward Zachary Ableser (born March 16, 1978) is a Democratic politician. He served in the Arizona Senate, representing the 26th district. His district included parts of Mesa, Tempe, and south Scottsdale. Previously he was a member of the Arizona House of Representatives. He resigned from public office in September 2015 to work in the Nevada Department of Education.

Ableser was appointed to fill the state senate term of former state senator Harry Mitchell and subsequently ran successfully for the Arizona House of Representatives. In 2012, he successfully ran for the Arizona Senate in the newly formed 26th district.
Other notable positions include Assistant Pastor, Exchange Tempe Community. Worship-Service Producer, University Presbyterian Church, Member, League of Conservation Voters, 2004 City of Tempe Dr. Martin Luther King Jr. Diversity Award recipient.

Personal life
He is an alumnus of Arizona State University, holding two bachelor's degrees in political science and Chinese, and a master's degree in Counseling Psychology. He graduated in May, 2014, with a PhD in Justice Studies from Arizona State University, and also owns and runs Ableser Family Counseling, a mental health counseling firm.  On November 22, 2019 the Arizona Board of Behavioral Health Examiners and Ableser entered into a consent agreement to not practice counseling for five years due to not following professional standards.

On July 11, 2009, Ableser married Hilary Heller in Lake Tahoe, Nevada. Hilary's father is former Republican US Senator, Dean Heller, of Nevada. The couple have three children together: two daughters, Brielle and Ava, and a son, Zachary. The couple adopted Ava whom they adopted from an orphanage in China.

References

External links

   official AZ State Senate site
 Ed Ableser  official campaign website

Democratic Party Arizona state senators
Arizona State University alumni
Latter Day Saints from Arizona
1978 births
Living people
People from Tarzana, Los Angeles